Fotheringham is a surname of Scottish origin which means "a house supplying food." Fotheringhame is a variant spelling. Notable people with the surname include:

 Aaron Fotheringham (born 1991), American wheelchair athlete
 Alasdair Fotheringham, British journalist
 Allan Fotheringham (born 1932), Canadian journalist
 Henry Fotheringham (born 1953), South African former cricketer
 John Knight Fotheringham (1874–1936), British historian who was an expert on ancient astronomy and chronology
 Kai Fotheringham (born 2003), Scottish footballer with Dundee United
 Kevin Fotheringham (born 1975), Scottish footballer with East Fife
 Mark Fotheringham (Australian footballer) (born 1957), Australian rules footballer
 Mark Fotheringham (Scottish footballer) (born 1983), Scottish footballer with Fulham
 Philip Fotheringham-Parker (1907–1981), English racing driver
 William Fotheringham, British journalist and author
 Willie Fotheringham, Scottish footballer
Fotheringhame
 Pattie Fotheringhame, (died 1955) Australian journalist

See also 
 Thomas Cook (Scottish politician) aka Thomas Fotheringham Cook (1908–1952)
 Nancy Fotheringham Cato (1917–2000), Australian author

References

Surnames of Scottish origin
Toponymic surnames
English toponymic surnames